Maxime Renaux (born 17 May 2000) is a French professional motocross racer.

Achievements
At 11 August 2021 Renaux won 3 GP in the Motocross World Championship.

References

External links
 Maxime Renaux at MXGP web site

Living people
2000 births
French motocross riders
People from Sedan, Ardennes
Sportspeople from Ardennes (department)